The Aqaba Special Economic Zone Authority (ASEZA) is the financially and administratively autonomous institution responsible for the management, regulation, and the development of the Aqaba Special Economic Zone (ASEZ).

History
The Aqaba Special Economic Zone ASEZA was inaugurated in 2001 as an initiative by the government of Jordan to ensure that Aqaba’s commercial and cultural prominence develops to be a regional hub for trade, tourism, and culture.
Six ministerial level commissioners, each responsible for a major area of regulatory or operational activity, govern the ASEZ. ASEZA is a service – oriented organization offering one – stop assistance covering all investment needs.

Mission
The Aqaba Special Economic Zone Authority (ASEZA) is the autonomous ASEZ management, regulation, and development institution. It offers integrated services and assistance to every concerned business and ensures all governing laws and regulations of ASEZ are made public.

Master plan
In 2002, ASEZA adopted a comprehensive master plan that encompasses development activities in the Zone for the promotion of portal, urban, tourist, commercial, academic, and other investment sectors. Developed planning already covers five special areas:

Aqaba Town
Modern architecture is to complement the old city traditional elements, thus creating a unique cultural environment, and which is more, new opportunities for investors especially in the tourist, commercial, and residential areas of development 
Port Areas
The Aqaba Port Areas include the Main Port, the Container Port and the Southern Industrial Port. According to the Master Plan, a common location—the Main Port—is established to merge the three existing port area activities into one expanded entertainment, residential, hotel and cruises service center.
Coral Coastal Zone
The Coral Coastal Zone is undergoing a wide residential, hotel and entertainment facilities construction process for the development of an advanced community resort, with respect to relative beach and coral reef protection requirements.
Southern Industrial Zone
The Zone extends along the Southern Industrial Zone Port and consists of reorganized and expanded current sites. New transportation systems, including a railway terminal, will serve the developed area.
Airport Industrial Zone
Ideal for industrial facilities, permitted land uses in the Zone include logistics and distribution, high-tech industries, warehousing, light manufacturing, showrooms, office complexes and airport-related business activities.

The Master Plan aims at preserving natural resources within the construction frame. It comprises several zones and reserves for the protection of Aqaba's cultural, archaeological, historical and natural heritage and diversity. Areas include: Five environmental zones, coral reserves, archaeological reserves, natural area reserves and a Beach Protection Zone.

Aqaba International Laboratories
Aqaba International Laboratories - BEN HAYYAN was established under the EU funded programme “IS-ASEZA”, to support ASEZA in guiding the Aqaba Special Economic Zone towards becoming a dynamic and attractive engine of economic growth, enhancing public health and streamlining trade in the zone, Jordan and the region.
The Physical, Chemical and Microbiological Laboratories of BEN HAYYAN offer analytical and advisory services for food and environment, operating under two interdependent units; the food laboratory and the environment laboratory.

Aqaba Development Corporation
Aqaba Development Corporation (ADC) was launched by ASEZA and the Government of Jordan at the beginning of 2004, ADC owns Aqaba's seaport, airport and strategic parcels of land as well as the development and management rights for these assets in addition to key infrastructure and utilities. The Aqaba Development Corporation (ADC) was launched with the objective of unlocking the potential of the Aqaba Special Economic Zone by accelerating its economic growth and development.

Chief Commissioners 
As of 2019, Aqaba Special Economic Zone has had 8 chief commissioners:

 June 2016 – present: Nasser Shraideh
 Nov 2014 - Jun 2016: Hani Mulki
 Aug 2012 - Nov 2014: Kamel Mahadin
 2011 - Aug 2012: Nasir Al Madadha
 2010 - 2011: Mohammed Saqer
 2007-2010: Husni Abu Ghaida
 2004-2007: Nader Dahabi
 2002-2004: Akel Biltaji

See also 
 Qualifying Industrial Zone

External links 
 ASEZA
 Aqaba

Aqaba
Economy of Jordan
Divisions and subsidiaries of the prime ministry (Jordan)
Special economic zones